This glossary of botanical terms is a list of definitions of terms and concepts relevant to botany and plants in general. Terms of plant morphology are included here as well as at the more specific Glossary of plant morphology and Glossary of leaf morphology. For other related terms, see Glossary of phytopathology, Glossary of lichen terms, and List of Latin and Greek words commonly used in systematic names.

A

B

C

D

E

F

G

H

I

J

K

L

M

N

O

P

Q

R

S

T

U

V

W

X

Z

See also
 Glossary of biology
 Glossary of plant morphology
 Glossary of leaf morphology
 Glossary of lichen terms
 Glossary of mycology
 Glossary of scientific naming
 Plant morphology
 Floral formula – abbreviations used in describing flower parts

References

Bibliography

 In .

External links
 Wiktionary
 Glossary at: APweb
 A glossary of botanical terms in English At: Flora, etc.
 Garden Web
 eFloras
 Categorical Glossary for the Flora of North America Project

Royal Botanical Gardens at Kew

 Standard glossary (archive)
 Stuppy, W. Glossary of Seed and Fruit Morphological Terms

Australia and New Zealand

 University of Sydney: Eflora – Glossary
 Florabase (Western Australia)
 Flora of Australia Online Glossary
 Flora of Australia Abbreviations
 Flora of S Australia
 Botany Word of the Day. Illustrated with New Zealand natives
 New Zealand Plant Conservation Network

Africa

 
 Plants of southern Africa

Branches of botany
Glossaries of botany
-
 
 Botanical Terms
Wikipedia glossaries using description lists